The Convention on the Transboundary Effects of Industrial Accidents is a United Nations Economic Commission for Europe (ECE) convention signed in Helsinki, Finland, on 17 March 1992, that entered into force on 19 April 2000. The Convention is designed to protect people and the environment against industrial accidents. The Convention aims to prevent accidents from occurring, or reducing their frequency and severity and mitigating their effects if required. The Convention promotes active international cooperation between countries, before, during and after an industrial accident.

The Convention helps its Parties – that is, States or certain regional organizations that have agreed to be bound by the Convention – to prevent industrial accidents that can have transboundary effects and to prepare for, and respond to, accidents if they occur. The Convention also encourages its Parties to help each other in the event of an accident, to cooperate on research and development, and to share information and technology.

The Conference of the Parties was constituted as the Convention's governing body at its first meeting in Brussels on 22–24 November 2000.

As of August 2013, the Convention has 41 parties, including the European Union, Russia, and most other countries in all parts of Europe, as well as Armenia, Azerbaijan and Kazakhstan. The treaty has been signed but not ratified by Canada and the United States.

At its third meeting, in 2004, the Conference of the Parties adopted an Assistance Programme to support the countries from Eastern Europe, Caucasus and Central Asia and South Eastern Europe in implementing the Convention.

The Protocol on Civil Liability for Damage and Compensation for Damage Caused by Transboundary Effects of Industrial Accidents on Transboundary Waters, was adopted in Kyiv, Ukraine on 21 May 2003. The Protocol is a joint instrument to the Convention on the Transboundary Effects of Industrial Accidents and to the Convention on the Protection and Use of Transboundary Watercourses and International Lakes. The Protocol was signed by 24 European states but as of 2013, the Protocol has been ratified only by Hungary and is not in force.

See also
Environmental issues

References

External links
Convention on the Transboundary Effects of Industrial Accident
Signatures and ratifications
Signatures and ratifications (Protocol)

United Nations Economic Commission for Europe treaties
Environmental treaties
Treaties concluded in 1992
Treaties entered into force in 2000
Treaties of Albania
Treaties of Austria
Treaties of Azerbaijan
Treaties of Armenia
Treaties of Belarus
Treaties of Belgium
Treaties of Bosnia and Herzegovina
Treaties of Bulgaria
Treaties of Croatia
Treaties of Cyprus
Treaties of the Czech Republic
Treaties of Denmark
Treaties of Estonia
Treaties entered into by the European Union
Treaties of Finland
Treaties of France
Treaties of Germany
Treaties of Greece
Treaties of Hungary
Treaties of Italy
Treaties of Kazakhstan
Treaties of Latvia
Treaties of Lithuania
Treaties of Luxembourg
Treaties of Monaco
Treaties of Montenegro
Treaties of the Netherlands
Treaties of Norway
Treaties of Poland
Treaties of Portugal
Treaties of Moldova
Treaties of Romania
Treaties of Russia
Treaties of Serbia
Treaties of Slovenia
Treaties of Slovakia
Treaties of Spain
Treaties of Sweden
Treaties of Switzerland
Treaties of North Macedonia
Treaties of the United Kingdom
Convention
1992 in Finland
Transboundary environmental issues